Trust Me - I'm A Holiday Rep is a reality television show that was broadcast by Five in the United Kingdom.

The first series ran nightly with ten programmes over two weeks.  It chronicles attempts by six celebrities to work as holiday reps for tour group Olympic Holidays.  The programme was presented by Toby Anstis and Nancy Sorrell.

Series 2 was also broadcast nightly over ten days from Monday 18th - Wednesday 27 September. Again the celebs were working for Olympic Holidays, this time in Malia in Crete in Greece. The series was presented by Lucy Rusedski and Andy Goldstein.

2005 Series 1: Ayia Napa

The celebrities who took part were:
Jordan Knight (former New Kids on the Block member)
Jasmine Lennard (notable entrant in Five's Make Me A Supermodel)
Syd Little (comedian)
Jodie Marsh (glamour model)
Nina Myskow (newspaper columnist)
Scott Wright (former Coronation Street actor)
Nadia Almada (Big Brother UK series 5 winner) - Lennard's replacement

Nadia was drafted in to replace Lennard after she was "sacked" halfway through the show for continuous breaking of the rules and general bad attitude.

2006 Series 2: Crete

Filmed in July 2006 in the resorts of Malia, Stallis and Sissi in eastern Crete.

The celebrities who took part were:
Brandon Block - DJ
Emma Jones - famous for her kiss'n tells on Dwight Yorke and James Hewitt
Nancy Lam - celebrity chef
Rowland Rivron - presenter
Samantha Rowley - actress who had previously come fourth in the Five's Make Me A Supermodel and currently appears on Channel 4's reality show, Seven Days.
Noel Sullivan - formerly of Hear'Say
Paul Burrell - former royal butler (Rowley's replacement)

Rowley quit the show on day 5 but was quickly replaced by former royal butler, Paul.

Executive Producer: Claire Zolkwer,
Series Producer: Helen Cooke,
Producer: Simon McKeown & Jane Eames,
Assistant Producer: Rebecca Wilcox,
Researcher: Jason Oates, David Smyth,
Runner: Holly Abey

Both series were amongst the first major TV series to be edited online using Blackbird.

References

Channel 5 (British TV channel) reality television shows
2005 British television series debuts
2006 British television series endings
2000s British travel television series
2000s British reality television series